The Wulai Waterfall or Kuân-tsuí (lit. high water) in Taiwanese Hokkien, is a waterfall in Wulai District, New Taipei, Taiwan.

Geology
The height of the waterfall is around 80 meters. It has a width of around 10 meters.

Transportation
The base of the waterfall is accessible by Wulai Scenic Train at Waterfall Stop.

See also
 List of waterfalls

References

Waterfalls of New Taipei
Wulai District